Camptotelus is a genus of true bugs belonging to the family Oxycarenidae.

The genus was first described by Fieber in 1860.

The species of this genus are found in Europe.

Species:
 Camptotelus lineolatus (Schilling, 1829)

References

Lygaeoidea
Hemiptera genera